Duane Pomeroy (born 1952) is a Kansas politician and teacher who has served on the Topeka city council continuously since January 1993, was deputy mayor of Topeka, Kansas under Butch Felker, and then became acting mayor from November 2003 to early January 2004 after a scandal forced Felker's resignation. As a member of the council, he was barred from being selected as a replacement mayor and James McClinton was appointed to the position in December 2003 and sworn in the following month.

As a show of support for Felker, Pomeroy did not use his desk or his office during his time as acting mayor. (He moved in a separate desk and moved the old desk out of the way.) He also did not sit in the mayor's position during city council meetings, instead keeping his spot as the deputy mayor.

Pomeroy was born in Topeka and attended Washburn University, where he received a Bachelor's degree in political science, as well as a teaching certification. He subsequently taught government and social studies at Topeka High School, where he has been dubbed "P-Roy" by his students and athletes. He is also the head tennis coach for the Trojans, as well as the head coach of the school's bowling team, which, as of the 2014–2015 school year, is only in its tenth year of existence.

He and his wife Deborah have two sons.

External links
Capital-Journal article, Pomeroy assumes new duties
Index of Capital-Journal articles about the ouster of Felker

1952 births
Living people
Schoolteachers from Kansas
Kansas city council members
Mayors of Topeka, Kansas